Rancho was an Indian monkey and animal actor, best known for his lead role as Rancho in 90's popular TV detective series, Raja Aur Rancho, aired on DD Metro and had acted in more than 50 Bollywood films, including Katilon Ke Kaatil (1981), Zahreelay (1990), Mera Shikar (1988) and Ahankaar (1995).

Selected filmography

Television 
 Raja Aur Rancho, (1997-1998), as Rancho

Further reading

See also 
 Animals in film and television
 List of individual monkeys

References 

Individual monkeys
Individual animals in India
1990s in India
Animal actors